Norway competed at the 2000 Summer Paralympics in Sydney, Australia. 39 competitors from Norway won 15 medals, including 2 gold, 6 silver and 7 bronze to finish 40th in the medal table.

Medal table

See also 
 Norway at the Paralympics
 Norway at the 2000 Summer Olympics

References 

Norway at the Paralympics
2000 in Norwegian sport
Nations at the 2000 Summer Paralympics